Fifteen referendums were held in Switzerland during 1992. The first two were held on 16 February on popular initiatives "for a financially bearable health insurance" and "for the drastic and stepwise limitation of animal experiments." Both were rejected by voters. The next seven were held on 17 May on joining and contributing to the Bretton Woods system (both approved), a federal law on water protection (approved), a popular initiative "for the recovery of our waters" (rejected), a federal resolution on the popular initiative "against the malpractice of gene technology on humans" (approved), a federal resolution on creating a civilian service alternative to military service (approved) and a change to the Strafgesetzbuch and the Military Penal Code on sexual integrity (approved).

A third set of six referendums was held on 27 September on a federal resolution on building a transalpine rail route (approved), a federal law on the standing orders of the Federal Assembly (approved), federal laws on the salaries and expenses of members of the Federal Assembly (both rejected), an amendment to the stamp duty law (approved) and a federal law on farmland (approved). The final referendum was held on 6 December on a federal resolution on the European Economic Area, and was narrowly rejected.

Results

EEA referendum result by canton

References

Referendums
Switzerland
Referendums in Switzerland
Switzerland–European Union relations